Neuenstein is a municipality in the Hersfeld-Rotenburg district of northeastern Hesse, Germany.

Geography

Location 
The community lies in the Knüllgebirge (range) in the drainage basin of the Geisbach, which rises here and only 10 km from here, in Bad Hersfeld, empties into the Fulda.

Neighbouring communities 
Neuenstein borders in the north on the community of Knüllwald (in the Schwalm-Eder-Kreis), in the east on the community of Ludwigsau, in the south on the towns of Bad Hersfeld and Kirchheim (all in Hersfeld-Rotenburg), in the southwest on the community of Oberaula, and in the west on the town of Schwarzenborn (both in the Schwalm-Eder-Kreis).

Constituent communities 
Neuenstein's Ortsteile are Aua, Gittersdorf, Mühlbach, Obergeis, Raboldshausen, Saasen, Salzberg and Untergeis.

History 

The first documentary mention of any of the constituent communities came in 852 when Aua (Owe) was named in one of the Hersfeld Abbey’s donation documents. The abbot at Hersfeld founded a monastery here in 1190, although this moved to Blankenheim, now an outlying centre of Bebra, in 1229.

The community of Salzesberg had its first documentary mention in 1190. There is however a document from 782 about this place, but its authenticity is in dispute. All other places had their first documentary mentions in the 12th and 13th centuries. Most constituent communities were long under the Hersfeld Abbey’s or were fiefs of the Lords of Wallenstein. Albert I of Wallenstein built a castle above Saasen that had its first documentary mention in 1267 as Neuwallenstein (the family’s ancestral seat was Wallenstein Castle – now a ruin – in Knüllwald-Wallenstein). On 24 July 1318, the castle, which had since become a den for robber barons, was destroyed by Hessian Landgrave Otto’s troops as well as the Hersfeld Abbot Simon I of Buchenau’s and Count Johann I of Ziegenhain’s men, and also Eberhard von Breuberg’s, who was the state justice of the peace and Imperial state Vogt. Only in 1357 was the castle restored by Simon von Wallenstein.

Neuenstein Castle is nowadays used as a conference and event centre.

Amalgamations 
The above-named constituent communities merged into the new greater community of Neuenstein with effect from 1 January 1972, with the exception of Obergeis, which was only merged, forcibly, in the course of municipal reform on 1 August 1972.

The new community’s namesake was the castle, whose mediaeval name was Neuwallenstein Castle (it is now called Neuenstein Castle, or Burg Neuenstein in German).

Politics

Community council 

The municipal election held on 26 March 2006 yielded the following results:

Mayors 
After the greater community's formation, Konrad Käberich took charge of the mayor's job from December 1972 to August 1973. The first elected mayor was Georg Ries from January 1974 to January 1980. After him came Walter Schmidt, replaced by Walter Glänzer (CDU) in 2003. The current mayor, Roland Urstadt, was elected on 26 September 2021 with 63% of the vote.

Coat of arms 
The community's arms might be described thus: Gules a mount of three vert upon which barrulets argent and issuant from which a tower of the last.

The tower belongs to Neuenstein Castle, and is the community's landmark.

Culture and sightseeing

Buildings 
 Former monastery church in the constituent community of Aua from 1190
 Neuenstein Castle in the constituent community of Saasen
 Wall graves of the family von Wallenstein in the constituent community of Raboldshausen 
 Chapel from 1194 in the constituent community of Mühlbach

Natural monuments 
 Eisenberg (mountain)
 Archaeological hiking path at the Eisenberg
 Roughly 1,200-year-old linden in the constituent community of Aua

Economy and infrastructure

Transport 
The community lies right at interchange 85, Bad Hersfeld-West on Autobahn A 7 (Flensburg–Füssen). Furthermore, Bundesstraße 324 runs through the municipal area.

Established businesses 
 General Logistics Systems GmbH & Co.OHG with roughly 800 employees
 Der Kurier GmbH (courier) countrywide transport of rush deliveries overnight

References

External links 

  

Hersfeld-Rotenburg